KPFX (107.9 FM, "107.9 The Fox") is a classic rock radio station licensed to serve Kindred, North Dakota, serving the Fargo-Moorhead metropolitan area. The radio station is owned by Jim Ingstad's Radio FM Media, and is the flagship radio station for North Dakota State University Football and Men's Basketball.

Its studios are located on 7th Avenue South in Fargo, while its transmitter is located near Sabin, Minnesota.

Ownership
In May 1999, Triad Broadcasting reached a deal to acquire this station (along with KQWB 1660 (Sports Talk), KQWB-FM 98.7 (Active rock), KVOX 99.9 (Country), and KLTA 105.1 (Hot AC)) from brothers Jim and Tom Ingstad as part of a twelve-station deal valued at a reported $37.8 million.

On November 30, 2012, Triad Broadcasting signed a Definitive Agreement to sell all 32 of their stations to Larry Wilson's L&L Broadcasting for $21 Million. Upon completion of the sale on May 1, 2013, L&L in turn sold the Fargo stations to Jim Ingstad, who had just sold his competing cluster to Midwest Communications. An LMA (Local Marketing Agreement) was placed so Ingstad could take immediate control of the stations, and the sale became final July 2, 2013. The sale was worth $9.5 million.

On August 4, 2014, KPFX moved its transmitter from its longtime home near Wolverton, MN to just south of Sabin, MN, giving the station an optimal signal in the Fargo-Moorhead metro area, and great coverage of the Detroit Lakes, MN area.

61 for 61 Radiothon
Since 1997, The Fox has partnered with Merticare's Roger Maris Cancer Center to hold a three-day radiothon event, usually towards the end of September. The on-air portion includes stories from survivors and the family members who lost the battle to Cancer. A memorial wall (originally a billboard in its early years) is put up where family members can put the names of loved ones who have had cancer. The event is held in honor of Roger Maris, a North Dakota native, Baseball legend and Cancer victim himself. The event also includes live performances from local bands, games for the kids and the 61 for 61 home run walk.

Program schedule
 Robbie, Dave & Moose (Mon-Fri 5:30a-9a)
 Robbie Daniels (Mon-Fri 10a-1p)
 Fish (Mon-Fri 2p-7p)
 The FOX Weeknights (Mon-Fri 7p-10p)

References

External links
107.9 The Fox website
Go Radio Website

PFX
Classic rock radio stations in the United States
Radio stations established in 1993
1993 establishments in North Dakota